Vishant More (born 25 November 1991) is an Indian cricketer. He made his first-class debut on 3 November 2007, for Maharashtra in the 2007–08 Ranji Trophy. He made his Twenty20 debut on 18 January 2021, for Maharashtra in the 2020–21 Syed Mushtaq Ali Trophy.

References

External links
 

1991 births
Living people
Indian cricketers
Maharashtra cricketers
Place of birth missing (living people)